Monita may refer to:

A unisex given name:
Monita Chatterjee, Indian-American medical scientist 
Monita Delamere (1921–1993), New Zealand rugby player
Monita Rajpal (born 1974), international journalist
Monita Tahalea, Indonesian pop, folk and jazz singer

A Latin word meaning "instructions":
Monita, work by Abbot Porcarius I of Lérins (c. 500)
Monita Secreta, an alleged code of instructions of the Jesuits